Governor Stable is a notable geologic formation in northern Lancaster County, Pennsylvania.  Scattered along the northern bank of a small drainage are a high number of large diabase boulders.  Governor Stable is privately owned.  Friends of Governor Stable  administers a recreational lease on the property, allowing organization members access to the property for bouldering.

References

External links
Friends of Governor Stable

Geologic formations of Pennsylvania
Geography of Lancaster County, Pennsylvania
Climbing areas of the United States